The Olympic Committee of North Macedonia is the National Olympic Committee of North Macedonia. Members of the committee are 26 sports federations, which elect the Executive Council composed of the president and four members.

It is based in the country's capital, Skopje.

History
The Olympic Committee of North Macedonia was founded as the Olympic Committee of the Former Yugoslav Republic of Macedonia in 1992 and recognized by the International Olympic Committee in 1993 reflecting the disputed status of its country's official name. In March 2019, the IOC approved its name change to the Olympic Committee of North Macedonia.

List of presidents

Assignments and aims
The Committee aims to develop the sport activity and sport education in North Macedonia. It also works to spread the Olympism and to interest the young people in the value of the sport and the Olympic Games. The main assignments and aims of the Committee are:
 The preparation and participation of athletes from the Republic of Macedonia in the Summer and Winter Olympic Games.
 The development and spreading of the Olympic Movement in North Macedonia.
 To spread the ground principles of the Olympism throughout the country using activities and programs which integrate with the educative and cultural life of the people.
 The development of the most popular sports at the highest levels.
 The development of international cooperation in the realm of sports.
 To carry out activities which combat discrimination and racism.

Executive committee
 President: Daniel Dimevski 
 Vice Presidents: Primislav Dimovski, Pero Antić
 Secretary General: Sasho Popovski 
 Sport director: Vladimir Bogoevski

Member federations
The National Federations are the organizations that coordinate all aspects of their individual sports. They are responsible for training, competition and development of their sports. There are currently 23 Olympic Summer and three Winter Sport Federations in North Macedonia.

See also
North Macedonia at the Olympics

References

External links
Official website

North Macedonia
Olympic
1992 establishments in the Republic of Macedonia

Sports organizations established in 1992